Edward Lawrence Smith (January 22, 1875 – ?) was an American attorney and judge who served as the United States Attorney for the District of Connecticut under two presidents. In addition he was the 35th Mayor of Hartford, Connecticut, Connecticut.

Biography 
Born to Andrew Jackson and Julia Agnes (Burke) Smith on January 22, 1875, in Hartford, Connecticut, Edward L. Smith was one of 5 children. He would go on to become a lawyer, politician, and judge in Connecticut. He served a four-year term as United States Attorney after resigning from the bench. His first political ventures where running for the Connecticut House of Representatives, however he never was elected to that body. He served as the mayor of Hartford for one term as a Democrat in a heavily republican town.

References

1875 births
20th-century American lawyers
20th-century American judges
20th-century American politicians
Connecticut Democrats
Connecticut lawyers
Mayors of Hartford, Connecticut
People from Hartford, Connecticut
United States Attorneys for the District of Connecticut
Yale Law School alumni
Yale University alumni
Year of death missing